Castellón Alto is an Argaric culture archaeological site located in Galera, Granada and dated between 1900 and 1600 BE during the Bronze Age.

It consists on a habitat where is located three natural terraces with houses and the hillside. The upper terrace is separated from the rest of the town by a perimeter wall, forming an acropolis area where the elites of the town lived with fundamental elements for survival such as the cistern or a water tank. It is noteworthy the 130 graves, which except for children's burials in an urn, are found in artificial covachas carved into the rock, mostly sealed by large slabs.

It was excavated from June to July 1983 and from September to November by the University of Granada.

References

External links
 

Bien de Interés Cultural landmarks in the Province of Granada
Archaeological sites in Andalusia